Traumpartner TV was a German free-to-air interactive TV channel, which could be received by satellite (DVB-S) and some cable networks (DVB-C). The subsidiary of RTL interactive GmbH (formerly RTL NEWMEDIA GmbH) started broadcasting via Astra 19.2°E on 1 December 2004 and offered a dating programming; broadcast daily live from 6 am to 10 pm.

On 1 October 2007, the management confirmed the termination of the program as of 31 October 2007. This was due to the fact that the targets had been set, were not achieved.

Interactivity
The interactivity was due to the possibility of paying for a chat on the screen via Short Message Service (SMS) or Multimedia Messaging Service (MMS). In addition, there was the possibility to communicate with other participants via a connected online dating platform.

Hosts
The face of the station was long time Juliane Ziegler, a winner of the RTL television show The Bachelor. Shermine Shahrivar moderated from December 2004 to August 2005.

From time to time guest or co-moderators appeared, e.g.:
Carsten Spengemann
Nazan Eckes
Isabel Varell
Ruth Moschner
Oli.P (Oliver Petszokat)

References

External links
 

Defunct television channels in Germany
German-language television stations
Television channels and stations established in 2004
Television channels and stations disestablished in 2007
2004 establishments in Germany
2007 disestablishments in Germany
RTL Group
Mass media in Cologne